Martha M. Escutia (born January 16, 1957) is an American politician and attorney who served as a member of the California State Senate from 1998 until 2006 and California State Assembly from 1992 until 1998.

Early life and education 
Escutia was born and raised in East Los Angeles. Escutia earned a bachelor's degree in public administration University of Southern California and received her J.D. degree from Georgetown University Law Center. She holds certificates in Advanced International Legal Studies of Trade and Tariffs from the World Court at The Hague, and in Foreign Investment from the National Autonomous University in Mexico City.

Career
Escutia represented California's 30th State Senate district. She served as Chair of the Senate Committee on Energy, Utilities and Communications (EU&C) and was also the first woman Chair of the 27-member California Legislative Latino Caucus.

As a Senator, Escutia held key leadership positions including: Chair of the Senate Health and Human Services Committee as a freshman senator, the first Latina Chair of the Senate Judiciary Committee, the first woman Chair of the Assembly Judiciary Committee, and Chair of the California Legislative Women's Caucus.

Throughout her career, Escutia championed universal health care for children and is recognized as the creator of Healthy Families. Seeking to protect California's children from unhealthy levels of air contaminants, she established the first-ever Children's Environmental Health Protection Act.

Escutia was also successful in passing legislation to implement the first low-cost auto insurance program for low-income residents in Los Angeles and San Francisco counties.

The California Labor Federation AFL-CIO named her "Legislator of the Year" for her advocacy on behalf of working men and women. Her outstanding work on environmental issues has brought recognition from the California League of Conservation Voters, the Sierra Club and the American Lung Association. The Los Angeles County Board of Supervisors has commemorated her "Commitment to the People of Los Angeles County." She was also awarded the "Good Housekeeping Award for Women in Government" for her work on the Children's Environmental Health Protections. In 1999, the California School Boards Association awarded her its "Legislator of the Year Award" for her efforts on behalf of schoolchildren and K-12 education.

In November 2005, the Corona New Primary Center in Bell, California, was dedicated the Martha Escutia Primary Center in her honor.

Since 2013, Escutia has served as Vice President of the University of Southern California for Government Relations.

Personal life
Escutia has two children, Andres and Diego.

References

External links
Escutia's Profile with Manatt, Phelps, and Phillips
California School Boards Association Q&A with Martha Escutia
Profile and The Senators firm

Join California Martha Escutia

|-

1957 births
21st-century American politicians
21st-century American women politicians
California state senators
Georgetown University Law Center alumni
Hispanic and Latino American state legislators in California
Hispanic and Latino American women in politics
Living people
Members of the California State Assembly
Mexican-American people in California politics
People from East Los Angeles, California
USC Sol Price School of Public Policy alumni
Women state legislators in California